Mrityunjoy Prasad Guha (26 August 1919 – 26 June 2012) was an Indian scholar, academic. He is noted for his work on Akash O Prithibi for which he was awarded Rabindra Puraskar in 1964.

Early life and education

Mrityunjoy was born to a Bengali Hindu family of Mymensingh, then part of India; now Bangladesh which became a new country in 1971 following its separation from Pakistan which, in turn, was earlier shaped as a result of the partition of British India in 1947.

He completed his intermediate & formal education at Rajshahi College (1934-1938).  Later on he pursued Masters in Chemistry at Presidency College, Calcutta University (1938–40).

Literary work
 Bijnaner Bichitra Barta (Bengali) fetched him UNESCO Prize from Govt. of India in 1969.
 Sagarpranider Katha (Bengali)
 Akash O Prithibi (Bengali)
 Sonar Bangla Tomai Bhalobasi (Bengali)
 Stanyapayee Pranider Katha (Bengali)
 Alor Jharna (Bengali)
 Aparup Rupkatha (Bengali)
 Desh Bidesher Rupkatha Ebang Upakatha (Bengali)
 Chalo Jai Chander Deshe  (Bengali)
 Jiber Kramabikash (Bengali)
 Petroleum (Bengali)
 On The Constitution Of Some Oxyacids Of Sulphur (English)

Recognition and honours
 B.Sc. (Honors) Chemistry, Rajshahi College, 1938
 M.Sc (First Class) 3rd Place, Calcutta University, 1940
 Cunningham Memorial Prize, Presidency College, Calcutta 1940
 Griffith Memorial Prize, Calcutta University, 1952
 Ph.D, Calcutta University, 1955
 Rabindra Puraskar, Govt. of West Bengal, 1964
 UNESCO Prize for Manuscript entitled 'Bijnaner Bichitra Barta' in Bengali, Govt. of India, 1969
 Sishu Sahitya Rashtriya Puraskar, 1970
 Ila Chanda Memorial Prize (Bangiya Bijnan Parishad)
 Kishore Gyan Vigyan Puraskar, 1993
 T.M. Das Foundation Award, 2002

References

Sources

 
 Rabindra Puraskar
 
 
 
 
 

Bengali writers
Recipients of the Rabindra Puraskar
University of Calcutta alumni
1919 births
2012 deaths
Writers from West Bengal